The Diocese of Saint Asaph is a diocese of the Church in Wales in north-east Wales, named after Saint Asaph, its second bishop.

Geography

The Anglican Diocese of St Asaph in the north-east corner of Wales stretches from the borders of Chester in the east, to the Conwy valley in the west, to Bala in the south-west, and Newtown in the south-east. The population is in excess of half a million people.

The more populous areas are to be found along the coast and in the large conurbation of Wrexham, the principal town. The industrial areas around Wrexham and Deeside have undergone great change in the past decade or so. Where once the coal, steel and textile industries provided most of the employment, the economy is now much more diversified and one of the fastest growing in the UK. A major employer is Airbus UK (currently part of BAE Systems), while Wrexham Industrial Estate is one of the largest in Europe. North-east Wales also acts as a dormitory area for Chester Business Park, which is dominated by MBNA. This economy is ministered to by an Industrial Chaplain, a post which alternates between a Church in Wales priest and a Presbyterian Church of Wales minister.

Most of the diocese is rural, interspersed with small market towns and village communities. The southern area of the diocese in north Powys is undergoing regional development, especially with the advent of a good number of small industries. Because of the beauty of the landscape, at holiday times there is a large influx of visitors from England and further afield. Tourism is now one of the growth industries of this area of Wales.

Traditionally, the Diocese of St Asaph extended across the border into England. However, following disestablishment on 31 March 1920, the Shropshire parishes of Criftins, Hengoed, Kinnerley, Knockin, Llanyblodwel, Llanymynech, Melverley, Morton, Oswestry, St Martins,  Selattyn, Trefonen, Weston Rhyn and Whittington were transferred from the Diocese of St Asaph to the English Diocese of Lichfield.

History
This diocese was founded by St. Kentigern about the middle of the sixth century, when he was exiled from his see in Scotland. He founded a monastery called Llanelwy at the confluence of the rivers Clwyd and Elwy in north east Wales, where after his return to Scotland in 573 he was succeeded by Asaph or Asa, who was consecrated Bishop of Llanelwy.

The diocese originally coincided with the Welsh principality of Powys, but lost much territory first by the Mercian encroachment marked by Watt's dyke and again by the construction of Offa's dyke, soon after 798. Nothing is known of the history of the diocese during the disturbed period that followed. Domesday Book gives scanty particulars of a few churches but is silent as to the cathedral.

Early in the twelfth century, Norman influence asserted itself and in 1143 Theobald, Archbishop of Canterbury, consecrated one Gilbert as Bishop of St. Asaph, but the position of his successors was very difficult and one of them, Godfrey, was driven away by poverty and the hostility of the Welsh. A return made in the middle of the thirteenth century (British Library, Cotton MSS, Vitellius, c. x.) shows the existence of eight rural deaneries, seventy-nine churches, and nineteen chapels. By 1291 the deaneries had been doubled in number and there were Cistercian houses at Basingwerk, Aberconway, Strata Marcella and Valle Crucis, and a Cistercian nunnery, Llanllugan Abbey. The cathedral, which had been burnt in the wars, was rebuilt and completed in 1295. It was a plain massive structure of simple plan, and was again destroyed during the English succession Wars of the Roses. When it was restored by Bishop Redman the palace was not rebuilt and thus the bishops continued to be nonresident. At the end of the fifteenth century there was a great revival of church building, as is evidenced by the churches of that date still existing in the diocese.

The chief shrines in the diocese were St. Winefred's Well, St. Garmon in Yale, St. Dervel Gadarn in Edeirnion, St. Monacella at Pennant and the Holy Cross in Strata Marcella. All these were demolished at the Anglican Reformation. At that time the diocese contained one archdeaconry, sixteen deaneries and one hundred and twenty-one parishes.    The bishop at this time had five episcopal residences, four of which were assumed by the Church of England bishop under Edward VI.

The Report of the Commissioners appointed by his Majesty to inquire into the Ecclesiastical Revenues of England and Wales (1835) found the see had an annual net income of £6,301. This made it the wealthiest diocese in Wales and the fourth richest in Britain after Canterbury, London and Winchester.

Lists of archdeacons

Archdeacons of St Asaph

Archdeacons of Montgomery

The archdeaconry was created from that of St Asaph on 6 February 1844.

Archdeacons of Wrexham
The archdeaconry was created from those of St Asaph and of Montgomery on 25 March 1890.
Some archdeacons of Wrexham are recorded with the title Archdeacon of Wrexham and Ruthin.
1890–1897 (res.): David Howell
1897–1910 (res.): Llewelyn Wynne Jones
1910–1925 (res.): William Fletcher
1925–1930 (d.):   Lewis Pryce
1930–1947 (ret.): James Williams
1948–1957 (res.): Richard Mackenzie Williams
1957-1969  (res): Benjamin Jones-Perrott
1969–1978 (ret.): John Davies
1978–1987 (d.):   Raymond Foster
1987–2001 (ret.): Bryan Williams
2001–2010 (res.): Malcolm Squires
2010–2013 (ret.): Shirley Griffiths
2014–2018:        Bob Griffiths
7 October 20182021:     John Lomas (became Bishop of Swansea and Brecon)

Archdeaconries and deaneries

List of churches 
The diocese has expended a great deal of effort in recent years to reorganise its system of 14 deaneries and parishes into 20 Mission Areas, each containing between six and nineteen churches and being ministered to by two to ten stipendiary clergy.

Alyn Deanery

Closed churches in the area

Cedewain Deanery

Closed churches in this area

Dee Valley Deanery

Closed churches in the area

Denbigh Deanery

Closed churches in the area

Dyffryn Clwyd Deanery

Closed churches in the area

Hawarden Deanery

Closed churches in the area

Holywell Deanery

Closed churches in this area

Llanrwst and Rhos Deanery

Closed churches in the area 

1Occasional services still held

Mathrafal Deanery

Closed churches in the area

Mold Deanery

Closed churches in the area

Penedeyrn Deanery

Closed churches in the area 

1occasional services still held

Pool Deanery

Closed churches in this area

St Asaph Deanery

Closed churches in this area

Valle Crucis Deanery

Closed churches in the area

Wrexham Deanery

Closed churches in the area

See also
Bishop of Saint Asaph
Archdeacon of St Asaph

References

Sources and references

 http://www.newadvent.org/cathen/13332c.htm

Dioceses of the Church in Wales